Di royte fon ("The Red Banner") may refer to:
 Di royte fon (1906), a newspaper published in Congress Poland in 1906
 Di royte fon (1920), a newspaper published in Vilna, Lithuania in 1920

See also 
 Red Banner